This list is of the biostratigraphic zones of Japan. The determinant Cretaceous "indices" being local species of Inoceramidae and Desmoceratoidea, the schema also differs from that of other regions.

Cretaceous

Palaeogene and Neogene
Palaeogene and Neogene stages in western Japan include (from the Middle Eocene to the Early Miocene):
 
 
 
 
 
 

Other Neogene stages include:

References

Geology of Japan
Biostratigraphy